Play Deep is the debut studio album by English rock band The Outfield, released on 12 August 1985 by Columbia Records. The album received widespread popularity with the success of their debut single, "Say It Isn't So" (a regional number-one hit), which reached number 18 on the U.S. rock chart, and the follow up single, "Your Love", reached number 6 on the Billboard Hot 100 in 1986. Play Deep peaked at number 9 on the U.S. albums chart and was later certified double Platinum. In total, four of the tracks reached the charts: the aforementioned two, along with "Everytime You Cry" and "All the Love".

The singles, "Your Love" and "All the Love", reached numbers 83 and 96, respectively, on the UK Singles Chart.

Track listing

Personnel

The Outfield
 Tony Lewis – bass guitar, vocals
 John Spinks – guitars, vocals
 Alan Jackman – drums, percussion

Additional musicians
 Reg Webb – keyboards, backing vocals
 Frank Callaghan – additional vocals

Technical
 William Wittman – production, recording, mixing
 Rick Chertoff – executive production
 Andy "Carb" Canelle – recording
 John Agnello – mixing
 George Marino – mastering at Sterling Sound (New York City)

Charts

Weekly charts

Year-end charts

Certifications

References

1985 debut albums
Columbia Records albums
The Outfield albums